Baculoviral IAP repeat-containing protein 2 (also known as cIAP1) is a protein that in humans is encoded by the BIRC2 gene.

Function 

cIAP1 is a member of the Inhibitor of Apoptosis family that inhibit apoptosis by interfering with the activation of caspases.

Interactions 

BIRC2 has been shown to interact with:

 CASP9, 
 DIABLO, 
 GSPT1, 
 HSP90B1, 
 HTRA2, 
 RIPK1, 
 RIPK2 
 TNFSF14, 
 TRAF1, 
 TRAF2,  and
 UBC.

References

Further reading

External links
 

Proteins
Microbiology